David Irons Jr. (born October 9, 1982) is a former American football cornerback. He was drafted by the Atlanta Falcons in the sixth round of the 2007 NFL Draft. He played college football at Auburn.

Irons also played for the Florida Tuskers and Sacramento Mountain Lions. He is the older brother of former NFL running back and Auburn teammate Kenny Irons.

College career

Butler Community College
Irons began his college career at Butler Community College in 2001 but was unable to play that season due to a knee injury and resulting surgery. In the 2002 season, he recorded 45 tackles and two interceptions. In 2003, he helped lead the BCC Grizzlies to an NJCAA National Championship with 59 tackles, three interceptions, and nine pass breakups.

Auburn
After moving on to Auburn in 2004, David again injured his knee in pre-season practice and did not play in the Tigers' undefeated season. He was able to return and start in eleven games in 2005 and was named to the AP All-SEC Second-team with 48 tackles (36 solo, 12 assists) and 11 pass break-ups. Due to his knee injuries, Irons applied for and was granted an additional year of eligibility by the NCAA. He had already graduated with a Bachelor of Arts, but began coursework towards a master's degree in the fall semester of 2006 to maintain his eligibility. Prior to the 2006 season, David was named to the Coaches All-SEC First-team and the Jim Thorpe Award Preseason Watch List. Irons finished the regular season with 39 tackles (22 solo, 17 assists), 11 pass break-ups and two interceptions and was named to the Coaches All-SEC Second-team.

Professional career

Atlanta Falcons
In 2008, Irons was placed on season-ending injured reserve with a knee injury. He was waived on July 28, 2009.

Personal
His brother Kenny Irons, was a teammate at Auburn and was selected in the 2nd round (49th overall) of the 2007 draft by the Cincinnati Bengals.  He is the nephew of Gerald Irons and Leroy Jackson and he is the cousin of Grant Irons, Jarrett Irons and Paul Irons.

References

1982 births
Living people
People from Dacula, Georgia
Sportspeople from the Atlanta metropolitan area
Players of American football from Camden, New Jersey
African-American players of American football
American football cornerbacks
Butler Grizzlies football players
Auburn Tigers football players
Atlanta Falcons players
Florida Tuskers players
Sacramento Mountain Lions players
21st-century African-American sportspeople
20th-century African-American people
Irons family (American football)